Christopher Luverne Sieber (born February 18, 1969) is an American actor. He is best known for his roles Kevin Burke in Two of a Kind (American TV series) and Agatha Trunchbull in Matilda the Musical.   He was nominated for the Tony Award for Best Featured Actor in a Musical for his portrayal of Sir Dennis Galahad in Spamalot, and Lord Farquaad in Shrek the Musical,

Early life
Sieber was born in St. Paul, Minnesota, to Fred and Caron Sieber. He is the middle child of three. Mike, his older brother, was a swimmer, and his younger brother, Marc, was in drama alongside him. He is a 1988 graduate of Forest Lake Area High School in Forest Lake, Minnesota, and was inducted into the Forest Lake Schools Hall of Fame in June 2011. After graduating, Sieber went to New York City to study at the American Musical and Dramatic Academy.

Career

Stage 
Sieber made his off-Broadway debut in a production of the musical A Christmas Carol in 1994. Sieber has appeared in several Broadway musicals, including Into the Woods, Monty Python's Spamalot, and Shrek The Musical. For his roles in Spamalot and Shrek The Musical, Sieber was nominated for a Tony Award.

On June 1, 2007, Sieber sang tenor in the world premiere of Eric Idle's Not the Messiah (He's a Very Naughty Boy) in Toronto.

On January 31, 2014, it was announced that Sieber would be joining the company of Matilda the Musical on Broadway as Miss Trunchbull starting performances on March 18. However, due to a hand injury sustained in rehearsals, he did not start performances until April 18.

Television 
In 1998, Sieber made his television debut playing Kevin Burke, father to the Olsen twins on the ABC sitcom Two of a Kind. The series lasted for one season before its cancellation. From 2003 to 2004, Sieber returned to ABC for It's All Relative, in which he and John Benjamin Hickey played same-sex parents to Maggie Lawson; other co-stars in the series included Reid Scott, Harriet Sansom Harris, and Lenny Clarke. In 2007, Sieber portrayed an eccentric zoologist for NBC comedy pilot Wildlife, which was not ordered by the network. In 2010, Sieber led the ABC comedy pilot It Takes a Village alongside Leah Remini and Cheyenne Jackson. In addition to these roles, Sieber has also had guest-starring roles in series such as Sex and the City, Pushing Daisies, Law & Order: Special Victims Unit, and several episodes of The Good Wife.

Personal life 
While It's All Relative was being produced, Sieber came out as gay and said that he was happily partnered to actor and chef Kevin Burrows. They married on November 24, 2011, in New York City. The couple live on an island on Lake Tamarack in the Stockholm area of Hardyston Township, New Jersey.

Sieber is involved with Broadway Cares/Equity Fights AIDS (BC/EFA) and has appeared in several of its Broadway Cares revues, among other events the charity produces. He teaches classes on drama and performance.

Filmography

Film

Television

Theatre

Discography
 "What I Wanna Be When I Grow Up" by Scott Alan, singing the track Nothing More (2010)

Awards and nominations

References

External links
  
   

1969 births
Living people
American male musical theatre actors
American male stage actors
American male television actors
American gay actors
Male actors from Saint Paul, Minnesota
LGBT people from Minnesota
Forest Lake Area High School alumni
People from Hardyston Township, New Jersey
21st-century LGBT people
American Musical and Dramatic Academy alumni